| pcupdate = 18 December 2022
| ntupdate = 
Claudio Sparacello (born 19 April 1995) is an Italian football player. He plays for SS Nola 1925.

Club career
He made his Serie B debut for Trapani on 14 September 2015 in a game against Latina.

On 7 August 2018, he signed a two-year contract with Virtus Francavilla.

On 14 January 2019, he signed a 1.5-year contract with Teramo.

On 5 August 2019 he moved to Picerno. On 31 January 2020, he joined Siena on loan.

On 29 July 2021, he signed with Arezzo.

On 23 August 2022, Sparacello joined Casale in Serie D. 

On 7 December 2022,Sparacello joined SS Nola 1925 in Serie D.

References

External links
 

1995 births
Footballers from Palermo
Living people
Italian footballers
Torino F.C. players
A.C. Ancona players
Trapani Calcio players
Calcio Padova players
F.C. Südtirol players
U.S. Pistoiese 1921 players
Reggina 1914 players
Virtus Francavilla Calcio players
S.S. Teramo Calcio players
A.C.N. Siena 1904 players
S.S.D. Acireale Calcio 1946 players
S.S. Arezzo players
Casale F.B.C. players
Serie B players
Serie C players
Serie D players
Association football forwards